Chanmaguri (Sonmaguri in ancient times, Chanmaguri in the modern era) is a village in India and is located in the Rangia mandal/tehsil, Kamrup district, in the state of Assam. According to Census 2011 information the location code or village code of Chanmaguri village is 302384. Rangia is nearest town (12 km) and Guwahati is the nearest city (30 km) from Chanmaguri village.

The location is:
 Village name: Chanmaguri.
 Tehsil: Rangia.
 District: Kamrup-Rural.
 State: Assam.
 Country: India.
 PIN no: 781380.
According to 2011 census Chanmaguri's data:
 Total people: 1,194 (Male: 593, Female: 601)
 Literacy: 87.84% (Male: 96.05%, Female: 79.74%)

Etymology 
Once upon a time known as Sonmaguri (সোণমাগুৰী), Sonmaguri derives its name from the Assamese words "সোণ" meaning gold and "মাগুৰী" meaning one type of rice, means golden colour rice(Poddy). After revolution of time Sonmaguri change to Chanmaguri.

Agriculture 

Chanmaguri is a beautiful village. Coordinates of Chanmaguri village are 26°04′49″N, 91°33′35″E/ 26.0802867°N, 91.5596117°E. Various types of plants are cultivated in this village but mainly produced various types of rice, vegetables, Oil, etc.

Education 

Higher secondary bani bidyapith(1964), and 5No. Primary school(1910) are located in chanmaguri. A few well known administrative officer (Shri Pradip Ch. Saloi, IPS and Md. Fakharuddin Ahmed, ACS) and highly educated professors, doctor, teachers and others service persons came from this village. Literacy rate of chanmaguri is 87.84%.

Religion 

Both Hindu and Muslim are lives in this village. Both are co-operate each other. This is good for a nation. Chanmaguri Satra is approximately 100 years old. Various festival are celebrate here which is related to Mahapurukh Shri Shri Sankardev and Mahapurukh Madhabdev. And chanmaguri Mashzid is about 100 years old.

Climate 
Chanmaguri has a humid subtropical climate (Köppen climate classification Cwa), falling just short of a tropical savanna climate (Köppen climate classification Aw). The average annual temperature is 24.2 °C with extremes ranging from 40.6 °C recorded on 24 April 2014 to 3 °C recorded in January, 1964.

Transport 
Chanmaguri is accessible through National Highway 31 and Hajo-Guwahati state highway. All major private commercial vehicles play between chanmaguri and nearby towns. Nearest Railway station are Rangia Railway station and Guwahati Railway station.

References

Villages in Kamrup district